Below are the results of season five of the World Poker Tour (2006–2007). Following on from his win in the 2001 World Series of Poker Main Event Carlos Mortensen won the 2007 WPT Championship. This meant he became the first player to win both the World Series of Poker Main Event and WPT Championship.

Results

Mirage Poker Showdown

 Casino: The Mirage, Las Vegas
 Buy-in: $10,000
 4-Day Event: May 14, 2006 to May 17, 2006
 Number of Entries: 384
 Total Prize Pool: $3,724,800
 Number of Payouts: 36
 Winning Hand: K-5

Mandalay Bay Poker Championship

 Casino: Mandalay Bay, Las Vegas 
 Buy-in: $10,000
 5-Day Event: June 4, 2006 to June 8, 2006
 Number of Entries: 349
 Total Prize Pool: $3,385,300
 Number of Payouts: 50
 Winning Hand:

Grand Prix de Paris

 Casino: Aviation Club de France, Paris
 Buy-in: €10,000
 5-Day Event: June 12, 2006 to June 16, 2006
 Number of Entries: 232
 Total Prize Pool: €2,320,000 ($2,805,856)
 Number of Payouts: 27

Legends of Poker

 Casino: Bicycle Casino, Los Angeles
 Buy-in: $10,000
 5-Day Event: August 26, 2006 to August 30, 2006
 Number of Entries: 466
 Total Prize Pool: $4,520,200
 Number of Payouts: 45
 Winning Hand:

Borgata Poker Open

 Casino: Borgata, Atlantic City
 Buy-in: $10,000
 5-Day Event: September 15, 2006 to September 19, 2006
 Number of Entries: 540
 Total Prize Pool: $5,238,000
 Number of Payouts: 54
 Winning Hand:

Festa Al Lago

 Casino: Bellagio, Las Vegas
 Buy-in: $10,000
 5-Day Event: October 16, 2006 to October 20, 2006
 Number of Entries: 433
 Total Prize Pool: $4,200,100
 Number of Payouts: 100
 Winning Hand:

Canadian Open Championship

 Casino: Fallsview Casino Resort, Niagara Falls, Ontario, Canada
 Buy-in: Can$2,500
 3-Day Event: October 22, 2006 to October 24, 2006
 Number of Entries: 298
 Total Prize Pool: Can$720,533 (US$639,913)
 Number of Payouts: 27

North American Poker Championship

 Casino: Fallsview Casino Resort, Niagara Falls, Ontario, Canada 
 Buy-in: Can$10,000
 5-Day Event: October 25, 2006 to October 29, 2006
 Number of Entries: 497
 Total Prize Pool: Can$4,829,332 (US$4,288,965)
 Number of Payouts: 45
 Winning Hand:

World Poker Finals

 Casino: Foxwoods, Mashantucket, Connecticut
 Buy-in: $10,000
 4-Day Event: November 12, 2006 to November 16, 2006
 Number of Entries: 609
 Total Prize Pool: $5,749,481
 Number of Payouts: 60
 Winning Hand:

Doyle Brunson North American Poker Classic

 Casino: Bellagio, Las Vegas 
 Buy-in: $15,000
 6-Day Event: December 14, 2006 to December 19, 2006
 Number of Entries: 583
 Total Prize Pool: $8,482,650
 Number of Payouts: 100
 Winning Hand:

PokerStars Caribbean Adventure

 Casino: Atlantis, Paradise Island
 Buy-in: $7,800
 6-Day Event: January 5, 2007 to January 10, 2007
 Number of Entries: 937
 Total Prize Pool: $7,063,842
 Number of Payouts: 180
 Winning Hand:

World Poker Open

 Casino: Gold Strike Resort and Casino, Tunica
 Buy-in: $10,000
 5-Day Event: January 21, 2007 to January 25, 2007
 Number of Entries: 294
 Total Prize Pool: $2,812,000
 Number of Payouts: 27
 Winning Hand:

Borgata Winter Poker Open

 Casino: Borgata, Atlantic City 
 Buy-in: $10,000
 5-Day Event: January 26, 2007 to January 30, 2007
 Number of Entries: 571
 Total Prize Pool: $5,529,000
 Number of Payouts: 54
 Winning Hand:

L.A. Poker Classic

 Casino: Commerce Casino, Los Angeles 
 Buy-in: $10,000
 6-Day Event: February 24. 2007 to March 1, 2007
 Number of Entries: 791
 Total Prize Pool: $7,593,600
 Number of Payouts: 54
 Winning Hand:

L.A. Poker Classic
 Casino: Commerce Casino, Los Angeles
 Buy-in:
 2-Day Event: March 3, 2007
 Number of Entries: 420
 Total Prize Pool:
 Number of Payouts:
 Winning Hand:

Bay 101 Shooting Star

 Casino: Bay 101, San Jose, California
 Buy-in: $10,000
 5-Day Event: March 12, 2007 to March 16, 2007
 Number of Entries: 450
 Total Prize Pool: $4,490,000
 Number of Payouts: 45
 Winning Hand:

World Poker Challenge

 Casino: Reno Hilton, Reno
 Buy-in: $5,000
 4-Day Event: March 25, 2007 to March 28, 2007
 Number of Entries: 475 
 Total Prize Pool: $2,278,250
 Number of Payouts: 45
 Winning Hand:

Foxwoods Poker Classic

 Casino: Foxwoods, Mashantucket, Connecticut 
 Buy-in: $10,000
 6-Day Event: March 30, 2007 to April 4, 2007
 Number of Entries: 415
 Total Prize Pool: $3,898,635
 Number of Payouts: 40

WPT Championship

 Casino: Bellagio, Las Vegas 
 Buy-in: $25,000
 7-Day Event: April 21, 2007 to April 27, 2007
 Number of Entries: 639
 Total Prize Pool: $15,495,750
 Number of Payouts: 100
 Winning Hand:

Other Events
During season 5 of the WPT there was one special event that did not apply to the Player of the Year standings:
 The WPT Celebrity Invitational - March 3–5, 2007 - Commerce Casino - postscript to Event #14: L.A. Poker Classic

References

World Poker Tour
2006 in poker
2007 in poker